Hassan Afeef is a Maldivian film actor. He is celebrated as the actor being featured in the first Maldivian film and song. He is also noted to be the actor to have worked with most directors away from home and acted in most films that were shot abroad.

Career
In late 1979, Hassan Afeef, a cinema-goer used to watch several Bollywood films screened at limited cinemas in Maldives and imitate their acting afterwards among friends and family. A group of Maldivians including Afeef came up with the idea of making a regional film for the Maldivian audience though several obstacles emerged including incapability to secure finance and equipment. However, they were successful in acquiring a small camera which resulted in the first Maldivian song "Noorey Vidhee Moonun Roashan Ujaala" featuring Jim alongside Rahma. Shot at Sultan Park, the song was leaked prior its official release hence Afeef dismissed the project of making a film with the team.

After three years, under the helm of then Minister of Health, Musthafa Hussain, Afeef was cast as the lead for the first Maldivian film Thin Fiyavalhu (1982). The film tells a story of a romantic relationship between a girl who comes to Male' from an island and a boy who lives in the house she resides in Male'. The film was accepted and appreciated by the audience. In an interview, Afeef stated; "In the first film, little we did care about dialogue delivery. You are unsure of how you look and sound. It was made just for a namesake".

In 1994, Afeef starred alongside Chilhiya Moosa Manik, Arifa Ibrahim, Lillian Saeed and Mariyam Haajara in Ibrahim Rasheed's family drama Dhevana An'bi. He played the role of Shahid, a hotel manager who falls in love with a daughter of a wealthy bank manager. The film revolves around a couple who get separated due to discrimination regarding social status by a cunning mother-in-law. He was also part of the Mohamed Musthafa Hussain's critically acclaimed film Nufolhey Maa which focuses on a love triangle between a doctor, nurse and patient.

Afeef played the role of a teacher who becomes involved in an immoral relationship with one of his students, in Amjad Ibrahim's debut direction Huras (1996). The film was developed solely with the intention of winning Gaumee Film Awards though it failed to garner any award at 2nd Gaumee Film Awards ceremony. In 1999, Afeef played the role of a friend counselling his best friend on dealing with his obsessed girlfriend in Ahmed Ibrahim's Nuruhunvi Loabi. Also, he starred opposite Reeko Moosa Manik, Niuma Mohamed and Mariyam Nazima as an unlucky lover in Easa Shareef-directed Emme Fahu Dhuvas (1997) which follows a devious woman who sunders her best-friend's upcoming marriage by creating false accusation and staging misleading impressions. Mariyam Shauqee's widely acclaimed family drama television series Kahthiri was released during the following year, where he played the role of a mechanical engineer, living in a congested housing complex while dealing with several social issues.

He next starred in Ali Shameel's drama film Hithi Nimun (2001) opposite Mohamed Shavin, Mariyam Nisha and Sheereen Abdul Wahid, which follows the storyline of a stubborn young man who abandons his girlfriend when he discovers about her pregnancy. He was applauded for his performance as the short-tempered husband and a helpful friend, in the Abdul Faththaah-directed critically acclaimed television series, Thiyey Mihithuge Vindhakee (2003) which was considered as one of the best series production in television industry.

Afeef played the role of Shathir, a notable historian, who came to a haunted uninhabited island to prepare a thesis for his PhD in Abdul Fattah's horror film Eynaa (2004). It features Sheela Najeeb, Mohamed Manik, Ahmed Shah, Khadheeja Ibrahim Didi, Ibrahim Jihad and Nashidha Mohamed as six colleagues who go on a picnic to the same island and their battle for survival. The film garnered critical appreciation especially for its technical department and was a commercial success.

Personal life
After quitting films, Afeef became more involved in politics. He served as a member of Male' City Council administering 38 mosques. Regarding his decision to step aside from the industry, Afeef noted: "I was missing prayers back then. I feared more about directors and producers insecurity when I have to wash my make-up off for each prayer, ultimately missing several prayers".

Filmography

Short film

Television

References 

Maldivian male film actors
Living people
Year of birth missing (living people)